Mueang Thi railway station is a railway station located in Mueang Thi Subdistrict, Mueang Surin District, Surin Province.

References 

Railway stations in Thailand
Surin province